al-Amidi (after Amid city, modern Diyarbakır) may refer to:

 Abo al-Qasim al-Amidi
 Hamid al-Amidi (Hamid Aytaç)
 Sayf al-Din al-Amidi 
 Zayn al-Din al-Amidi